This article contains the results of the 2016 Republican presidential primaries and caucuses, the processes by which the Republican Party selected delegates to attend the 2016 Republican National Convention from July 18–21. The series of primaries, caucuses, and state conventions culminated in the national convention, where the delegates cast their votes to formally select a candidate. A simple majority (1,237) of the total delegate votes (2,472) was required to become the party's nominee and was achieved by the nominee, businessman Donald Trump of New York.

The process began on March 23, 2015, when Texas Senator Ted Cruz became the first presidential candidate to announce his intentions to seek the office of United States President. That summer, 17 major candidates were recognized by national and state polls, making it the largest presidential candidate field for any single political party in American history. The large field made possible the fact that the 2016 primaries were the first since 1968 (and the first in which every state held a contest) in which more than three candidates won at least one state.

When voting began in the 2016 Iowa caucuses, twelve major candidates were actively campaigning; these were (ordered by date of withdrawal from the race) former Governor Mike Huckabee of Arkansas, former Senator Rick Santorum of Pennsylvania, Senator Rand Paul of Kentucky, Governor Chris Christie of New Jersey, businesswoman and former Hewlett-Packard Chief Executive Officer Carly Fiorina, former Governor Jim Gilmore of Virginia, Governor Jeb Bush of Florida, former neurosurgeon and Johns Hopkins University Director of Pediatric Neurosurgery Ben Carson, Senator Marco Rubio of Florida, Senator Ted Cruz of Texas, Governor John Kasich of Ohio, and the eventual nominee, businessman and Trump Organization CEO Donald Trump.

Following poor results from the first-in-the-nation caucus, Huckabee was the first candidate to drop out. Santorum also ended his campaign after a poor performance in Iowa. Paul withdrew from the race after placing fifth in Iowa, and subsequently polling poorly leading into the New Hampshire primary. Christie, who put nearly all of his campaign's resources into the critical state of New Hampshire, withdrew on February 10, 2016, after finishing sixth in the state. Following Christie's announcement, Fiorina suspended her campaign, which was unable to gain traction. Gilmore, who severely lacked funding, campaign infrastructure, and support, surprised many political pundits by staying in the race as far as he did; he dropped out shortly after the New Hampshire primary. Bush withdrew from actively campaigning after finishing fourth in the South Carolina primary. After Super Tuesday, Carson announced that there would be "no path forward" for his bid for the Presidency, effectively suspending his campaign. On March 15, 2016, Rubio dropped out after losing his home state, leaving three active candidates (Cruz, Kasich, and Trump). Trump's resounding victory in the Indiana primary on May 3, 2016, prompted Cruz's exit from the race. The following day, Trump became the presumptive Republican nominee after Kasich dropped out. Trump was formally nominated by the delegates of the 2016 Republican National Convention on July 19, 2016, and proceeded to defeat Democratic nominee Hillary Clinton in the general election on November 8, 2016, to become the 45th President of the United States.

Overview of results

Major candidates

Notes
a Vote totals may include votes for minor candidates, "uncommitted", "no preference", "write-ins" or other options.
b In the Virgin Islands, 65% of the vote (1,063 votes) went to uncommitted delegates.
c In Guam, 8 out of 9 delegates initially went uncommitted, and 1 unpledged delegate initially went to Cruz.  After all candidates but Trump withdrew, Trump garnered the support of all 9.
d In Wyoming, 5% of the vote went to uncommitted delegates.
e In American Samoa, all 9 delegates initially went uncommitted.  After all candidates but Trump withdrew, Trump garnered the support of all 9.
f In North Dakota, some delegates have committed to Cruz or Trump, but these delegates are unpledged.

Other candidates
Prior to the Iowa caucuses, five major candidates, who had been invited to the debates, had withdrawn from the race after states began to certify candidates for ballot spots: Rick Perry, Scott Walker, Bobby Jindal, Lindsey Graham, and George Pataki. Other candidates, nearly 15 in New Hampshire alone, were able to make it on the ballot in individual states. Some votes for minor candidates are unavailable, because in many states (territories) they can be listed as Others or Write-ins. Since the beginning of the primary season, none of these other candidates have been awarded any delegates.

Results
Primary and caucuses can be binding or nonbinding in allocating delegates to the respective state delegations to the National convention. But the actual election of the delegates can be at a later date. Delegates are (1) elected at conventions, (2) from slates submitted by the candidates, (3) selected by the state chairman or (4) at committee meetings or (5) elected directly at the caucuses and primaries.Until the delegates are actually elected the delegate numbers are by nature projections, but it is only in the nonbinding caucus states where they are not allocated at the primary or caucus date.

Early states

Iowa

Nonbinding caucus: February 1, 2016
State convention: June 2016
National delegates: 30

New Hampshire

Primary date: February 9, 2016
National delegates: 23

South Carolina

Primary date: February 20, 2016
District conventions: April 2016
State convention: May 7, 2016
National delegates: 50

Nevada

Primary date: February 23, 2016
County conventions: March 12 – April 2, 2016 (presumably)
State convention: May 7 – 8, 2016 (presumably)
National delegates: 30

Super Tuesday
Super Tuesday is the name for March 1, 2016, the day on which the largest simultaneous number of state presidential primary elections will be held in the United States. It  will include Republican primaries in nine states and caucuses in two states, totaling 595 delegates (24.1% of the total). North Dakota holds the last caucus on Super Tuesday, but there is no presidential straw poll, and all the delegates elected later at its convention will be unbound. Colorado and Wyoming take a straw poll, but it is non-binding, and no delegates are allocated on Super Tuesday. The 2016 schedule has been dubbed the "SEC Primary", since many of the participating states are represented in the U.S. collegiate Southeastern Conference.

The participating states include Alabama, Alaska caucuses, Arkansas, Georgia, Massachusetts, Minnesota caucuses, Oklahoma, Tennessee, Texas, Vermont, and Virginia.

Alabama

Primary date: March 1, 2016
National delegates: 50

Alaska

Primary date: March 1, 2016
National delegates: 28

Arkansas

Primary date: March 1, 2016
National delegates: 40

Georgia

Primary date: March 1, 2016
National delegates: 76

Massachusetts

Primary date: March 1, 2016
National delegates: 42

Minnesota

Precinct Caucuses date: March 1, 2016
State Convention: May 20–21, 2016
National delegates: 38

Oklahoma

Primary date: March 1, 2016
National delegates: 43

Tennessee

Primary date: March 1, 2016
National delegates: 58

Texas

Primary date: March 1, 2016
National delegates: 155

Vermont

Primary date: March 1, 2016
National delegates: 16

Virginia

Primary date: March 1, 2016
National delegates: 49

Early-March states
On March 5, 2016, one state held a primary while three others held caucuses. Because of the relative timeframe between Super Tuesday and because more than 100 delegates were awarded to each state's respective winner, the media has dubbed this date as "Super-Saturday." The following day, Puerto Rico voted in their own primary and between March 8 and April 1, 17 more states have voted or will vote.

Maine

Primary date: March 5, 2016
National delegates: 23

Kansas

Primary date: March 5, 2016
National delegates: 40

Kentucky

Primary date: March 5, 2016
National delegates: 46

Louisiana

Primary date: March 5, 2016
National delegates: 46

Puerto Rico

Primary date: March 6, 2016
National delegates: 23

Hawaii

Caucus date: March 8, 2016
National delegates: 19

Idaho

Primary date: March 8, 2016
National delegates: 32

Michigan

Primary date: March 8, 2016
National delegates: 59

Mississippi

Primary date: March 8, 2016
National delegates: 40

US Virgin Islands

Caucus date: March 10, 2016
National delegates: 9

Mid-March states

District of Columbia

Convention date: March 12, 2016
National delegates: 19

Guam

Caucus date: March 12, 2016
National delegates: 9

Gov. Eddie Calvo, one of the delegates from Guam, had announced his support for Cruz prior to the March 12 Guam caucus.  But, the slate of delegates all committed to Trump after both Cruz and Kasich dropped out.

Wyoming

County conventions date: March 12, 2016
National delegates: 12

Florida

Primary date: March 15, 2016
National delegates: 99

Illinois

Primary date: March 15, 2016
National delegates: 69

Missouri

Primary date: March 15, 2016
National delegates: 52

Northern Mariana Islands

Caucus date: March 15, 2016
National delegates: 9

North Carolina

Primary date: March 15, 2016
National delegates: 72

Ohio

Primary date: March 15, 2016
National delegates: 66

Late March states

Arizona

Primary date: March 22, 2016
National delegates: 58

Utah

Caucus date: March 22, 2016
National delegates: 40

American Samoa

Caucus date: March 22, 2016
National delegates: 9

April states

North Dakota

State Convention dates: April 1–3, 2016
National delegates: 28

Wisconsin

Primary date: April 5, 2016
National delegates: 42

Colorado

District Conventions dates: April 2, 2016 (districts 1, 6), April 7 (district 7), and April 8 (districts 2, 3, 4, 5)
State Convention date: April 9, 2016
National delegates: 37

Wyoming

State Convention date: April 14–16, 2016
National delegates: 17

New York

Primary date: April 19, 2016
National delegates: 95

Connecticut

Primary date: April 26, 2016
National delegates: 28

Delaware

Primary date: April 26, 2016
National delegates: 16

Maryland

Primary date: April 26, 2016
National delegates: 38

Pennsylvania

Primary date: April 26, 2016
National delegates: 71

Rhode Island

Primary date: April 26, 2016
National delegates: 19

May states

Indiana

Primary date: May 3, 2016
National delegates: 57

Nebraska

Primary date: May 10, 2016
National delegates: 36

West Virginia

Primary date: May 10, 2016
National delegates: 34

Oregon

Primary date: May 17, 2016
National delegates: 28

Washington

Primary date: May 24, 2016
National delegates: 44

June states

California

Primary date: June 7, 2016
National delegates: 172

Montana

Primary date: June 7, 2016
National delegates: 27

New Jersey

Primary date: June 7, 2016
National delegates: 51

New Mexico

Primary date: June 7, 2016
National delegates: 24

South Dakota

Primary date: June 7, 2016
National delegates: 29

See also 
 2016 Republican National Convention
 Democratic Party presidential primaries, 2016
 Nationwide opinion polling for the Republican Party 2016 presidential primaries
 Republican Party presidential candidates, 2016
 Republican Party presidential debates, 2016
 Republican Party presidential primaries, 2016
 Statewide opinion polling for the Republican Party presidential primaries, 2016

References 
Notes

Citations

External links 
 RNC 2016 Republican Nominating Process 
 Green papers for 2016 primaries, caucuses, and conventions

Republican Party presidential primaries, 2016